Yonggan de xin (勇敢的心 Brave Heart) is a 2007 Chinese language rock album by Wang Feng.

The album was awarded the best lyrics prize at Shanghai Media & Entertainment Group's Dongfang Fengyun (:zh:东方风云榜) awards.

References

2007 albums
Wang Feng (singer) albums